is a local railway station on Kintetsu Kashihara Line. It is located in Tawaramoto, Nara, Japan, between Tawaramoto Station and Yamato-Yagi Station. It is near the Buddhist temple Jinraku-ji.

Lines 
 Kintetsu Railway
 Kashihara Line

Platforms and tracks

History
 1923—Kasanui Station was opened by the Osaka Electric Tramway as the Unebi Line was extended from Hirahata to Kashiharajingu-mae Station.
 1941—Owned by the Kansai Express Railway that merged with the Sangu Express Railway.
 1944—Owned by the Kinki Nippon Railway that merged with the Nankai Railway, the station was renamed as Kinki Nihppn Tawaramoto Station.
 Apr. 1, 2007—PiTaPa, a reusable contactless stored value smart card, has been available.

External links
 
 

Railway stations in Nara Prefecture
Tawaramoto, Nara